The 2021–22 South of Scotland Football League was the 76th season of the South of Scotland Football League, and the 8th season as the sixth tier of the Scottish football pyramid system. Stranraer reserves continued as the reigning champions due to the previous two seasons being declared null and void. The season began on 17 July 2021.

St Cuthbert Wanderers won the league title for the first time since the 2015–16 season, sealing the championship with a 6–2 victory over Nithsdale Wanderers on 27 April 2022.

Teams

Heston Rovers elected not to compete during the 2021–22 season.

 Club with an SFA Licence eligible to participate in the Lowland League promotion play-off should they win the league.

Caledonian Braves reserves and Stranraer reserves are ineligible for promotion.

League table

Results

References

External links

6
Sco
2021–22 in Scottish football leagues